Stonegate is a neighborhood in Fort Worth, Texas near the Texas Christian University campus on a hill overlooking downtown Fort Worth.

External links 
 http://www.winiklein.com/neighborhoods2/stonegate.html

Neighborhoods in Fort Worth, Texas